Uluberia Dakshin Assembly constituency is an assembly constituency in Howrah district in the Indian state of West Bengal.

Overview
As per orders of the Delimitation Commission, No. 178 Uluberia Dakshin Assembly constituency  is composed of the following: Uluberia I community development block, and Belari, Dhandali, Balichaturi and Nabagram gram panchayats of Shyampur I community development block.

Uluberia Dakshin Assembly constituency is part of No. 26 Uluberia (Lok Sabha constituency).

Members of Legislative Assembly

Election results

2021

2016

2011

 

.# Swing calculated on Congress+Trinamool Congress vote percentages taken together in 2006.

1977-2006
In the 2006, 2001, 1996 and 1991 state assembly elections, Rabindra Ghosh of Forward Bloc won the Uluberia South assembly seat, defeating his nearest rivals Pulak Roy of Trinamool Congress in 2006, Bani Kumar Singha of Trinamool Congress in 2001, Pulak Roy of Congress in 1996, and Amar Banerjee of Congress in 1991. Contests in most years were multi cornered but only winners and runners are being mentioned. Amar Banerjee of Congress defeated Rabindra Ghosh of Forward Bloc in 1987. Rabindra Ghosh of Forward Bloc defeated Minati Adhikari of Congress in 1982. Aurobindo Ghosal of Forward Bloc defeated Abani Basu, Independent in 1977.

1951-1972
Rabindra Ghosh, Independent, won in 1972. Bata Krishna Das of CPI(M) won in 1971. Biswanath Das Ghosh of Forward Bloc won in 1969 and 1967. Abani Kumar Basu won the Uluberia South seat in 1962. In 1957 and 1951 Uluberia had a double seat. In 1957 Abani Kumar Basu of Congress and Bijoy Bhusan Mondal of Forward Bloc won. Bijoy Mondal and Bibhuti Bhusan Ghosh, both of All India Forward Bloc (Ruikar) won in 1951.

References

Assembly constituencies of West Bengal
Politics of Howrah district
1952 establishments in West Bengal
Constituencies established in 1952